Misa Bharti (born 22 May 1976) is an Indian politician from the state of Bihar and the daughter of Lalu Prasad Yadav and Rabri Devi. In 2014, she unsuccessfully contested the Pataliputra Lok Sabha constituency and lost to RJD rebel Ram Kripal Yadav who had joined BJP.
She again lost in 2019 Lok Sabha election with a margin of more than 39,000 votes from the same Pataliputra constituency.

In June 2016, she was the party's nominee for the Rajya Sabha biennial elections and was elected unopposed along with Ram Jethmalani from Bihar.

Early life and education
Misa Bharti was born in 1976 to two former Chief Ministers of Bihar, Lalu Prasad Yadav and his wife Rabri Devi. Her father named Misa in honour of the Emergency-era Maintenance of Internal Security Act (MISA) under which Lalu was jailed. She is the eldest of her parents' nine children (7 daughters and 2 sons).

Misa joined the MBBS course in MGM Medical College, Jamshedpur in 1993 on a TISCO quota. She was later shifted to Patna Medical College Hospital (PMCH) citing security reasons. Misa topped the MBBS exams with a distinction in gynaecology from PMCH.

Personal life
Misa Bharati married Shailesh Kumar, a computer engineer, on 10 December 1999. The couple has three children, two daughters and one son. Misa is known to have a hot temperament.

Political career
Misa Bharti contested 2014 Lok Sabha elections from Pataliputra on a Rashtriya Janata Dal ticket. She lost to Ram Kripal Yadav, former most trusted man of Lalu Yadav. In June 2016, she was the party's nominee for the Rajya Sabha elections and was elected unopposed along with Ram Jethmalani from Bihar. She again contested 2019 Lok Sabha elections from Pataliputra losing to BJP's Ram Kripal Yadav.

References

Rashtriya Janata Dal politicians
Rajya Sabha members from Bihar
Living people
Women in Bihar politics
Yadav family of Bihar
1976 births
21st-century Indian women politicians
21st-century Indian politicians
Women members of the Rajya Sabha
United Progressive Alliance candidates in the 2014 Indian general election